Kehle Glacier is a glacier draining the western slopes of the Worcester Range, Antarctica. It is near Mount Speyer and Mount Dawson-Lambton, and flows southwest into Mulock Glacier. The glacier was named by the Advisory Committee on Antarctic Names in 1964 for Ralph Kehle, a glaciologist at Little America V, 1959–60.

References

Glaciers of Hillary Coast